Antiochtha is a genus of moths in the family Lecithoceridae.

Species
 Antiochtha achnastis Meyrick, 1906
 Antiochtha angustivalva Park, 2006
 Antiochtha aquila Park, 2002
 Antiochtha balbidota Meyrick, 1905
 Antiochtha cataclina (Meyrick, 1923)
 Antiochtha coelatella (Walker, 1864)
 Antiochtha foederalis (Meyrick, 1923)
 Antiochtha leucograpta (Meyrick, 1923)
 Antiochtha longivincula Wu & Park, 1998
 Antiochtha nakhonica Park, 2002
 Antiochtha oxyzona (Meyrick, 1910)
 Antiochtha periastra (Meyrick, 1910)
 Antiochtha pusilla Park, 2002
 Antiochtha pycnotarsa (Park & Wu, 2001)
 Antiochtha semialis Park, 2002
 Antiochtha stellulata Meyrick, 1906
 Antiochtha triangulosa Park, 2008
 Antiochtha vigilax (Meyrick, 1910)

References

Natural History Museum Lepidoptera genus database

 
Torodorinae
Moth genera